Twenty Your Life On 2 ( is a 2022 Chinese television drama starring Guan Xiaotong, Bu Guanjin, Dong Siyi and Xu Mengjie. It is the sequel to the 2020 series Twenty Your Life On. It aired on Hunan Television's Mondays to Saturdays at 20:30 (CST) time slot from August 17 until September 12, 2022.

Synopsis
Three years have gone by since college, and the four best friends are met with a new set of challenges as they enter a different stage of adulthood.

Cast

Main
 Guan Xiaotong as Liang Shuang
 The top beauty and skin care live streamer, but her career has ups and downs. After graduating from college, she chose a job she liked.
 Bu Guanjin as Jiang Xiaoguo
 In order to successfully find a job, she started his internship early. She later regained her original intention, and continued to work hard to improve herself.
 Dong Siyi as Duan Jiabao
 The rich second generation, from a businessman's family, she lives well, and has a simple mind and dreams. But all of a sudden her family economic crisis turned her from a "rich second generation" to a "negative second generation."
 Xu Mengjie as Ding Yixuan
 The new roommate who is a woman full of warmth and indifference to the world. She is an amateur writer and aspires to be a famous one. She also work in the front desk of the pet hospital.
 Li Gengxi as Luo Yan
 She is keen on playing games and reading comics. She entered a traditional company not far from home to work as a freelancer. Later on, she went to abroad to pursue her comics dream.
 Fei Qiming as Xi Song
Jiang Xiaoguo's classmate and work colleague.
 Xie Binbin as Zu Zhouchen
 Veterinarian from Ding Yixuan's pet hospital.
 Zhou Yiran as Yin Shang
 Rookie actor from Duan Jiabo's company. He dreams of becoming a well-known actor.
 Li Shen as Jiang Lanzhou
 The boss of the company where Liang Shuang work.

Supporting

People around Liang Shuang
 Xu Xiaosa as CEO Wang
 Li Wenling as Grandmother Liang
 Liu Pizhong as Father Liang
 Zhu Ran as Jiang Shuai
 Cui Jingge as Lili Ya

People around Jiang Xiaoguo
 Wei Wei as Alex
 Cao Zheng as Kris
 Xu Nannan as Sister Wang
 Yi Wang as Charles

People around Duan Jiabao
 Jiang Linyan as Mother Duan
 Wang Anyu as Duan Zhenyu

People around Ding Yixuan
 Zhou Xianxin as Mother Ding 
 Yu Hongzhou as Father Ding
 Liu Shuai Liang as Wei Jinnan

Episodes

Production
On September 10, 2020, Linmon Pictures released the 2021 episode list on its official Weibo account, and announced that there will be another season.

On July 16, 2022, the drama obtained a distribution license allowing the series to be broadcast.
The following month it was announced that the play will premiere on August 17, 2022 on Hunan Television, and will also be available on online streaming such as iQIYI, Mango TV and Netflix.

Original Soundtrack

Twenty Your Life On 2: Original soundtrack

References

External links
 
 

Chinese television shows
2022 Chinese television series debuts
Hunan Television dramas
Chinese drama television series
Television series by Linmon Pictures